Juliana Seraphim (Arabic: جوليانا سيرافيم; born 1934 in Jaffa) is a Palestinian artist.

Background
Seraphim was born in Jaffa in 1934, and was among the first waves of displaced Palestinian refugees to move to Beirut, Lebanon in 1952. She was 14 when her family fled first to Sidon by boat in 1949. After their move to Beirut, she worked in refugee relief while attending art classes.

Education and career
In Beirut, Seraphim developed her personal style and produced her most notable works. She privately studied with Lebanese painter Jean Khalifeh (1923–78) and her first exhibitions took place in his studio. After studying at the Lebanese Fine Arts Academy and privately with other local contemporary artists, she began to show her work in solo exhibitions and gained recognition within Beirut. In her studies, she was awarded grants to study abroad in Madrid, Florence, and Spain. She then went on to internationally represent Lebanon in three biennials - Alexandria (1962), Paris (1963), and São Paulo (1967).

Visual Language
Whereas her Lebanese contemporaries often take on a figurative style in order to demonstrate the central issues of the Palestinian struggle, Seraphim’s visual language is characterized as having complex layers of overlapping lines and improvisational dream-like imagery. In this way, Seraphim cultivates a shifting reality of infinite depth and creation. Her dream-like imagery also implies the unsteady nature of a long-held memory of a cherished place - and in doing so she transcribes her political concerns regarding her home through the lens of personal and surreal imagery while also encouraging the viewer to actively participate with the imagery presented. When asked, Seraphim cites the source of her surrealist imagery as memories of her childhood. She drew specific inspiration from the faded frescoes of winged beings on the ceiling of her grandfather's home, and former convent, in Jerusalem.

Exhibition History

Below is a selected list of Seraphim's exhibition history.

1960: Internationale Art Gallery in Florence, Italy
1961: La Licorne Art Gallery, Lebanon
1964: Elie Garzouzi Art Gallery, Lebanon
1965: Journal l'Orient Art Gallery, Lebanon
1976: Journal l'Orient Art Gallery, Lebanon
1969: Cassia Art Gallery, Lebanon
1971: Samir Nassif Art Gallery, Lebanon
1975: Brigitte Shehadeh Art Gallery, Lebanon
1977: Tabet Art Gallery in Paris, France
1978: Samia Toutoungi Art Gallery, Lebanon; “X” Art Gallery in Paris, France
1979: Art 3 Art Gallery in Paris, France
1980: National Gallery in Amman, Jordan
1981: Bekhazi Art Gallery, Lebanon
1983: Suzanne Pons Art Gallery in Cannes, France
1985: Gulf Hotel Art Gallery, Qatar
1987: La Toile Art Gallery in Rimal, Lebanon
1988: La Toile Art Gallery in Rimal, Lebanon
1989: Amadis Art Gallery in Madrid, Spain
1990: Khayal Art Gallery in Ehden, Lebanon
1991: Hotel Chahba-Cham Art Gallery in Aleppo, Syria
1992: Station des Arts Gallery, Lebanon

References 

Juliana Seraphim - OneFineArt.com

Palestinian women artists
Lebanese women painters
Palestinian women painters
1934 births
2005 deaths
Palestinian painters
Lebanese painters